is a passenger railway station located in the city of Zentsūji, Kagawa Prefecture, Japan. It is operated by JR Shikoku and has the station number "D13".

Lines

Layout
The station, which is unstaffed, consists of two opposed side platforms serving two tracks. A small tiled concrete building serves as a waiting room and is linked to platform 1. Access to platform 2 is by means of a level crossing.

Adjacent stations

History
The Sanyō Railway was nationalized on 1 December 1906, and the station came under the control of Japanese Government Railways (JGR) which renamed the network the Sanuki Line, and later, the Yosan Mainline. Japanese National Railways  (JNR), the successor to JGR, was privatized on 1 April 1987, and control of the station passed to JR Shikoku.

Surrounding area
 , the 76th temple on the Shikoku Pilgrimage is about 400 metres to the northeast of the station.

See also
List of railway stations in Japan

References

External links

 JR Shikoku timetable

Railway stations in Kagawa Prefecture
Railway stations in Japan opened in 1896
Zentsūji, Kagawa